Rosemary Aubert (born May 4, 1946) is a Canadian-American author, poet, and critic, most known for her Ellis Portal series of crime novels. She won the Arthur Ellis Award for best crime novel in 1999 for her book The Feast of Stephen.

Aubert was born in Niagara Falls, New York, but has lived in Canada for over 40 years. She currently resides in Toronto, where she teaches novel writing.

Bibliography

Poetry
 Two Kinds of Honey (1977)  
 Picking Wild Raspberries: The Imaginary Love Poems of Gertrude Stein (1997)
 Rough Wilderness: The Imaginary Love Poems of the Abbess Heloise (2011)
 Lenin for Lovers (2012)

Fiction

 Song of Eden (1982)
 A Red Bird in Winter (1983)
 Garden of Lions (1984)
 Firebrand (1985)
 Free Reign (1997)
 The Feast of Stephen (1999)
 The Ferryman Will Be There (2001)
 Leave Me By Dying (2003)
 The Red Mass (2005)
 The Judge of Orphans (2007)
 Terminal Grill (2013)

References

External links
Official website

Canadian mystery writers
Living people
Canadian women novelists
20th-century Canadian novelists
21st-century Canadian novelists
20th-century Canadian women writers
21st-century Canadian women writers
Women mystery writers
1946 births